Ashwin Rod Gover is a New Zealand mathematician and a Fellow of the Royal Society of New Zealand. He is currently employed as a Professor of Pure Mathematics at the University of Auckland in New Zealand. He is the PhD students' Adviser for the Department of Mathematics and is the head of the Analysis, Geometry and Topology Research Group at the University of Auckland.

Education and career 
Gover received his secondary education at Tauranga Boys' College, where he was Head Boy and Dux. He earned a Bachelor of Science with Honours and Master of Science in physics at Canterbury University and a Doctor of Philosophy (DPhil) in Mathematics in 1989 at Oxford. He joined the University of Auckland as a lecturer in 1999, before being promoted to Senior Lecturer in 2001, Associate Professor in 2005, and Professor in 2008.

Research areas 
His current main research areas are
 Differential geometry and its relationship to representation theory
 Applications to analysis on manifolds, PDE theory and Mathematical Physics
 Conformal, CR and related structures
He has published work on a range of topics including integral transforms and their applications to representation theory and quantum groups. His main area of specialisation is the class of parabolic differential geometries. Tractor calculus is important for treating geometries in this class, and a current theme of his work is the further development of this calculus, its relationship to other geometric constructions and tools, as well as its applications to the construction and understanding of local and global geometric invariants and natural differential equations. A list of his publications can be found here.

References

New Zealand mathematicians
Academic staff of the University of Auckland
Living people
Year of birth missing (living people)
Fellows of the Royal Society of New Zealand
People educated at Tauranga Boys' College